North Suburban Conference may refer to:
North Suburban Conference (Illinois)
North Suburban Conference (Minnesota)